Pentyrch railway station served the village of Pentyrch, in the historical county of Glamorgan, Wales, from 1840 to 1863 on the Taff Vale Railway.

History
The station was opened on 9 October 1840 by the Taff Vale Railway. It closed on 22 June 1863.

References

Disused railway stations in Cardiff
Former Taff Vale Railway stations
Railway stations in Great Britain opened in 1840
Railway stations in Great Britain closed in 1863
1840 establishments in Wales
1863 disestablishments in Wales